Nemapogon oregonella is a moth of the family Tineidae. It is found in North America, where it has been recorded from Oregon and California.

References

Moths described in 1900
Nemapogoninae